The Chehel Akhtaran Mosque is related to the Qajar dynasty and is located in the Qom County.

References

Mosques in Iran
Mosque buildings with domes
National works of Iran